Odradna Balka (Ukrainian: Одрадна Балка) is a village located in Berezivka Raion in Odesa Oblast in Ukraine. It belongs to Berezivka urban hromada, one of the hromadas of Ukraine. The village has a population of 25 people.

History
During World War II, 200 Jews from Odesa were brought in the village and kept in two barns. 
On March 15–16, 1942, they were all murdered by ethnic German militia from Tartakai.

See also
 1941 Odessa massacre
 List of massacres in Ukraine

References

Villages in Berezivka Raion
Holocaust massacres and pogroms in Ukraine
Holocaust locations in Ukraine
Mass murder in 1942